Chestnut Hills, North Carolina may refer to:
Chestnut Hills, Cumberland County, North Carolina
Chestnut Hills, Wake County, North Carolina

See also
Chestnut Hill, North Carolina (disambiguation)